Velocity of Sound is a record label formed in Pittsburgh, Pennsylvania, USA in 1999 by Darren Little and Todd Stoll. Concentrating on releasing 7" singles, Velocity of Sound released the world's first hair filled vinyl record in 2014 for Eohippus "Getting Your Hair Wet With Pee".

Roster
The Ceiling Stares
Eohippus
Epic Ditch
Fresh Vehicle
Hurts To Laugh
The Lees of Memory
Lonely Planet Boy
PUJOL
Shaky Shrines
Shockwave Riderz
The Super Vacations
Wild Vagina

References

External links
FACT Magazine
Modern Vinyl
Colored Vinyl Records
Spotify Playlist Promotion
Spotify Plays & Followers

American record labels
1999 establishments in Pennsylvania